Alan G. Hevesi (born January 31, 1940) is a former American politician and convicted felon who served as a New York State Assemblyman from 1971 to 1993, as New York City Comptroller from 1994 to 2001, and as New York State Comptroller from 2003 to 2006. Hevesi is originally from Queens, New York City.

A member of the Democratic Party, Hevesi was elected State Comptroller in 2002 and reelected in 2006. He resigned from office effective December 22, 2006, as part of a plea bargain with the Albany County Court related to his unlawful use of state employees to care for his ailing wife. In February 2007, Hevesi was sentenced to a $5,000 fine and permanently banned from holding elective office again; he received no jail time and no probation. He also pleaded guilty to corruption charges surrounding a "pay to play" scheme regarding the New York State Pension Fund; on April 15, 2011, he was sentenced to one to four years in prison.

Background
Hevesi's parents were Jewish immigrants who left Hungary in 1938 to escape the Nazis. 55 of Hevesi's relatives were murdered in concentration camps. Hevesi's father was Eugene Hevesi (1896–1983), a Hungarian-born American Jewish leader who served as foreign affairs secretary for the American Jewish Committee and as representative to the United Nations for several Jewish NGOs. His brother, Dennis, a reporter for The New York Times and Newsday, died in 2017.

Hevesi earned a Bachelor of Arts in 1962 from Queens College, CUNY. He received a Ph.D. in public law and government from Columbia University in 1971. The title of his doctoral dissertation was Legislative Leadership in New York State. Hevesi taught political science at Queens College for more than 30 years.

Hevesi and his wife Carol are residents of Forest Hills, Queens, New York. Their sons, New York State Assemblyman Andrew Hevesi and former New York State Senator Daniel Hevesi, have both had careers in politics.

Political career

State Assembly
On November 2, 1971, Hevesi was elected to the New York State Assembly to fill a vacancy caused by the resignation of Emanuel R. Gold. He took his seat during a special session in December 1971. Hevesi served in the Assembly for 22 years.

New York City Comptroller
Hevesi unsuccessfully sought the Democratic nomination for city comptroller in 1989, as did Frank Macchiarola. Both finished behind Brooklyn District Attorney and former Congresswoman Elizabeth Holtzman. In May 1993, Hevesi began his second campaign for city comptroller. The primary election again featured a three-way race, with Holtzman, Hevesi, and Herman Badillo. Hevesi defeated Holtzman to secure the Democratic nomination, then Badillo, who contested the general election as fusion candidate of the Republican Party and Liberal Party.

By December 1997, Hevesi enlisted the weight and soundness of his city's finances in the cause of forcing Swiss banks to meet the demands of the World Jewish Congress and other organizations then suing Swiss banks over Nazi-era bank balances the WJC said were owed to the heirs of victims of the Holocaust, joined eventually by both then-Mayor Rudolph Giuliani and then-Governor George Pataki. In his book on the subject, Norman Finkelstein called Hevesi "the godfather of Holocaust restitution sanctions."

Hevesi recruited many other states' and municipalities' financial officers to put their powers in the service of this cause, at one point calling them to a conference in New York at which they discussed ways to coordinate their actions for maximum effect. Sanctions against Switzerland having seemed successful in securing the $1.25 billion (1999) settlement, Hevesi then brought the power of the ad hoc network he had constructed to bear on subsequent actions against Germany, Austria, and other countries, where its use was deemed successful in raising the amounts of the settlements.

Hevesi served as New York City Comptroller from 1994 to 2002, when he was term-limited out of the office. He won his second term with a Liberal Party endorsement, after which former mayor David Dinkins declined to support him.

State Comptroller
In 2001, Hevesi sought the Democratic nomination for mayor of New York, running on the platform of "Most Experienced, Best Qualified". He finished fourth, behind Public Advocate Mark J. Green, Bronx Borough President Fernando Ferrer, and New York City Council Speaker Peter Vallone. Hevesi was the Liberal Party nominee for mayor in the general election, but did not campaign, instead endorsing Green. Following his defeat in the mayor's race, Hevesi started his campaign for state comptroller, defeating William Mulrow in a primary, followed by Republican John Faso in the 2002 election.

In November 2006, Hevesi was reelected as New York State Comptroller. On December 23, 2006, Hevesi pleaded guilty to a single felony, agreed to pay a fine of $5,000, and immediately resigned as comptroller.

Controversies

Commencement comments
At a commencement address he delivered at Queens College on June 1, 2006, Hevesi told his audience that U.S. Senator Charles Schumer was so tough he would "put a bullet between the President's eyes if he could get away with it." Several hours after his remarks, Hevesi apologized for his comments, calling them "beyond stupid, beyond moronic, totally offensive" and "incredibly moronic".

Using state employees to chauffeur wife
On September 21, 2006, Alan Hevesi admitted that he used Nicholas Acquafredda, a state employee and member of Hevesi's security detail, to drive and aid his ailing wife. Hevesi claimed that in 2003, the State Ethics Commission decided that he should pay back the entire cost of having a state employee chauffeur his wife unless such services were necessary for safety purposes. A spokesperson from the State Ethics Commission denied that such a decision was made.

On September 26, 2006, after his Republican challenger, Christopher Callaghan, asked the Albany County District Attorney's office to investigate the matter, Hevesi said he would reimburse the state more than $82,000 for having a public employee chauffeur his wife. Callaghan first phoned in the complaint to the State Comptroller's own hotline. Hevesi had admitted the previous week that he had not previously reimbursed the state. Callaghan and the 2006 Republican nominee for  Governor, John Faso, also called for Hevesi's resignation. Attorney General Eliot Spitzer, who was then running for Governor of New York, withdrew his endorsement of Hevesi. The controversy stimulated interest in the candidacies of Callaghan and minor party candidates Julia Willebrand of the Green Party and John Cain of the Libertarian Party.

Hevesi claimed that drivers were needed to provide security to his wife, though a bipartisan ethics panel concluded that the State Police found no threat that would justify such an arrangement. The panel also concluded that Hevesi had no intention of repaying the state for the services rendered to his wife until Callaghan publicly filed a complaint.

On October 12, 2006, Albany County District Attorney David Soares' office acknowledged that it was officially investigating actions by Hevesi regarding the public employee hired to chauffeur his wife.

On October 23, 2006, the "Ethics Commission concluded that Hevesi had 'knowingly' violated state law." On November 3, 2006, Hevesi was ordered by the office of state Attorney General Eliot Spitzer to reimburse the state $90,000 — in addition to the $83,000 he has already paid – in compensation for what had been deemed an improper use of a state employee. Hevesi apologized in a TV ad, stating, "I'm asking you to weigh my mistake against my 35 years of public service, I'm human...I'm a good comptroller who did a dumb thing."

On December 12, 2006, Hevesi agreed to a deal that called for the $90,000 in escrow money to be turned over to the state and for him to pay an additional $33,605 within 10 days, making his payback total (with $83,000 already paid) $206,000. According to the Attorney General's report, Hevesi had actually hired four (not two) employees as his wife's "security detail", and said employees ran personal errands for the Hevesi family. On December 13, 2006, a poll conducted between December 5–11 by Quinnipiac showed that 45% of people in New York believed that Hevesi should resign, while 43% believed that he had paid his debt to the state.

On December 14, 2006, the Albany County District Attorney acknowledged that he had a strong enough case to indict Hevesi. In February 2007, after Hevesi had pleaded guilty in December 2006 to a charge of defrauding the government, he was sentenced by Judge Stephen Herrick in Albany County Court to a $5,000 fine and barred permanently from elected office. As part of the plea deal, he was given no jail time and received no probation. Prior to sentencing, Hevesi paid the state more than $200,000 in restitution. He expressed remorse for his actions and told the judge: "I'm culpable, I'm responsible and I apologize."

Payoffs to Raymond Harding for political favors
On October 6, 2009, Raymond Harding, chairman of the Liberal Party of New York, pleaded guilty to charges that he accepted $800,000 from Hevesi's aides when Hevesi was comptroller of the state of New York.

Accepting gratuities
As state comptroller, Hevesi faced a conflict of interest allegation in relation to a private capital fund named Markstone Capital Partners, according to a report in the New York Sun. The opening paragraph stated, "The New York State comptroller, Alan Hevesi, encouraged California pension managers to invest in a private capital fund founded by a man whose wife has been a generous donor to his political campaigns." The story originally appeared in the Los Angeles Times.

Hevesi met with his California counterpart, comptroller Steve Westly, and Elliott Broidy of Markstone Capital Group. They met on May 19, 2003, in order to "pitch" the California Public Employees' Retirement System (CalPERS) to invest in Markstone, a fund that invested in Israeli companies. The Sun reported that in June 2003, Hevesi had invested $200 million in Markstone. Broidy is a major Republican political contributor who did not directly contribute to Hevesi's political campaigns, but Broidy's wife, Robin Rosenzweig, had contributed $80,000 since 2002 — $30,000 before the May 2003 meeting and $50,000 afterward. She also contributed to Andrew Hevesi's State Assembly race.

On October 7, 2010, Hevesi pleaded guilty to accepting gratuities for steering the investment funds to California venture capitalist Elliot Broidy. Hevesi had accepted $75,000 in trips for himself and his family and $500,000 in campaign contributions, and benefited from $380,000 given to a lobbyist. After being accused of "pay to play" practices involving the New York State Pension Fund during his tenure as Comptroller, Hevesi pleaded guilty to a corruption charge; on April 15, 2011, he was sentenced to one to four years in prison. He began his prison term on April 17, 2011.

Hevesi went before a parole board on November 14, 2012 and was released on parole on December 19, 2012. He served 20 months of a maximum four-year sentence.

Publications

Books

Journal articles

Newspaper articles

See also
New York State Comptroller
New York Comptroller election, 2006

References

External links
New York State: Office of the State Comptroller

1940 births
Living people
Columbia University alumni
Jewish American state legislators in New York (state)
American people of Hungarian-Jewish descent
Democratic Party members of the New York State Assembly
New York City Comptrollers
New York State Comptrollers
People from Forest Hills, Queens
2004 United States presidential electors
Queens College, City University of New York alumni
American politicians convicted of fraud
Prisoners and detainees of New York (state)
New York (state) politicians convicted of corruption
New York (state) politicians convicted of crimes
21st-century American politicians
21st-century American Jews